Semantics within psychology is the study of how meaning is stored in the mind. Semantic memory is a type of long-term declarative memory that refers to facts or ideas which are not immediately drawn from personal experience. It was first theorized in 1972 by W. Donaldson and Endel Tulving. Tulving employs the word semantic to describe a system of memory that involves “words and verbal symbols, their meanings and referents, the relations between them, and the rules, formulas, or algorithms for influencing them”.

Semantic memory

In psychology, semantic memory is memory for meaning – in other words, the aspect of memory that preserves only the gist, the general significance, of remembered experience – while episodic memory is memory for the ephemeral details – the individual features, or the unique particulars of experience. The term 'episodic memory' was introduced by Tulving and Schacter in the context of 'declarative memory' which involved simple association of factual or objective information concerning its object. Word meaning is measured by the company they keep, i.e. the relationships among words themselves in a semantic network. The memories may be transferred intergenerationally or isolated in one generation due to a cultural disruption. Different generations may have different experiences at similar points in their own time-lines. This may then create a vertically heterogeneous semantic net for certain words in an otherwise homogeneous culture. In a network created by people analyzing their understanding of the word (such as Wordnet) the links and decomposition structures of the network are few in number and kind, and include part of, kind of, and similar links. In automated ontologies the links are computed vectors without explicit meaning. Various automated technologies are being developed to compute the meaning of words: latent semantic indexing and support vector machines as well as natural language processing, artificial neural networks and predicate calculus techniques.

Ideasthesia
Ideasthesia is a psychological phenomenon in which activation of concepts evokes sensory experiences. 

The relationship between graphemes and colors, also known as grapheme-color synesthesia, is a typical example of ideasthesia. Here, the alphabet's letters are connected to vibrant color experiences. According to studies, the extracted meaning of a stimulus determines the context-dependent perception of color. For instance, depending on the context in which it is presented, an ambiguous stimulus '5' that can be read as either 'S' or '5' will have the color associated with either 'S' or '5'. If it is provided with other numbers, it will be read as "5" and associated with the respective color. If it is presented between letters, it will be recognized as a "S" and associated with the respective synesthetic color.

Psychosemantics
In the 1960s, psychosemantic studies became popular after Charles E. Osgood's massive cross-cultural studies using his semantic differential (SD) method that used thousands of nouns and adjective bipolar scales. A specific form of the SD, Projective Semantics method uses only most common and neutral nouns that correspond to the 7 groups (factors) of adjective-scales most consistently found in cross-cultural studies (Evaluation, Potency, Activity as found by Osgood, and Reality, Organization, Complexity, Limitation as found in other studies). In this method, seven groups of bipolar adjective scales corresponded to seven types of nouns so the method was thought to have the object-scale symmetry (OSS) between the scales and nouns for evaluation using these scales. For example, the nouns corresponding to the listed 7 factors would be: Beauty, Power, Motion, Life, Work, Chaos, Law. Beauty was expected to be assessed unequivocally as “very good” on adjectives of Evaluation-related scales, Life as “very real” on Reality-related scales, etc. However, deviations in this symmetric and very basic matrix might show underlying biases of two types: scales-related bias and objects-related bias. This OSS design meant to increase the sensitivity of the SD method to any semantic biases in responses of people within the same culture and educational background.

Prototype theory

Another set of concepts related to fuzziness in semantics is based on prototypes. The work of Eleanor Rosch in the 1970s led to a view that natural categories are not characterizable in terms of necessary and sufficient conditions, but are graded (fuzzy at their boundaries) and inconsistent as to the status of their constituent members. One may compare it with Jung's archetype, though the concept of archetype sticks to static concept. Some post-structuralists are against the fixed or static meaning of the words. Derrida, following Nietzsche, talked about slippages in fixed meanings.

Systems of categories are not objectively out there in the world but are rooted in people's experience. These categories evolve as learned concepts of the world – meaning is not an objective truth, but a subjective construct, learned from experience, and language arises out of the "grounding of our conceptual systems in shared embodiment and bodily experience".
A corollary of this is that the conceptual categories (i.e. the lexicon) will not be identical for different cultures, or indeed, for every individual in the same culture. This leads to another debate (see the Sapir–Whorf hypothesis or Eskimo words for snow).

Notes

References 

Cognitive psychology
Mental processes